Mezzanego is a comune (municipality) in the Metropolitan City of Genoa in the Italian region Liguria, located about  east of Genoa.

Location
The town is situated on the river Sturla in a valley of the same name.

Mezzanego borders the following municipalities: Borzonasca, Carasco, Ne, San Colombano Certénoli, Tornolo.

References

External links
 Official website

Cities and towns in Liguria